Leslie Winston (born May 13, 1956) is an American actress best known for playing Cindy, wife of Ben Walton, on the television series The Waltons from 1979 to 1981.

Career
Winston played the part of Cindy, wife of Ben Walton (played by Eric Scott), in 42 episodes through the last 3 seasons of the series. Her debut on the show was in an episode called "The Outsider" (season 7, episode 20) in which Ben surprises the family by introducing them to his new wife Cindy, who is the episode's eponymous character. Winston later played Cindy in four of the series reunion TV movies from 1982 to 1993. These were A Wedding on Walton's Mountain (1982), Mother's Day on Walton's Mountain (1982), A Day for Thanks on Walton's Mountain (1982) and A Walton Thanksgiving Reunion (1993). She has also made appearances on Quincy, M.E. and L.A. Law.

While filming The Waltons, Winston became a close friend of Judy Norton and Mary McDonough, who played two of her sisters-in-law; the trio were known on the set as "The Three Musketeers." McDonough, who was a bridesmaid at Winston's wedding, stresses the strong bonds that were created among the series cast and states in her autobiography that they are not just like a family but "really are a family." She also describes Winston and Norton as "real sisters."

Winston effectively retired as an actress in 1993, partly because of a broken elbow which incapacitated her for a year but mainly because she started a family and wished to devote her time to raising her two daughters. Her husband is Bob Yannetti, an assistant TV director. She turned to the less demanding role of looping and has worked on shows like Ally McBeal and Boston Legal. Her husband worked as director on some episodes of the latter.

References

External links

1956 births
Living people
American television actresses
20th-century American actresses
Actresses from Austin, Texas
21st-century American women
The Waltons